Ceylin del Carmen Alvarado (born 6 August 1998) is a Dominican-born Dutch cyclist, who currently competes in cyclo-cross for UCI Cyclo-cross Team , and in road cycling for UCI Women's Continental Team . In 2018, she won the gold medal in the Under-23 race at the UEC European Cyclo-cross Championships in Rosmalen. She repeated this feat in 2019. On 1 February 2020 she became world champion in the elite category at the 2020 UCI Cyclo-cross World Championships in Dübendorf, Switzerland.

Personal life
, Alvarado is in a relationship with fellow pro cyclist Roy Jans.

Major results

Cyclo-cross

2015–2016
 2nd National Under-23 Championships
2016–2017
 Qiansen Trophy
1st Fengtai
1st Yanqing
2017–2018
 2nd  UCI World Under-23 Championships
 Soudal Classics
3rd Hasselt
3rd Leuven
 Brico Cross
3rd Hulst
 3rd Woerden
2018–2019
 1st  UEC European Under-23 Championships
 1st  National Under-23 Championships
 1st  Overall Under-23 UCI World Cup
 1st Overall Under-23 Superprestige
 DVV Trophy
1st Brussels
 Superprestige
2nd Middelkerke
3rd Zonhoven
 2nd Neerpelt
 3rd  UCI World Under-23 Championships
 Brico Cross
3rd Geraardsbergen
 3rd Otegem
2019–2020
 1st  UCI World Championships
 1st  UEC European Under-23 Championships
 1st  National Championships
 1st Overall DVV Trophy
1st Ronse
1st Loenhout
1st Baal
1st Brussels
1st Lille
2nd Kortrijk
 1st Overall Superprestige
1st Gieten
1st Ruddervoorde
1st Middelkerke
2nd Zonhoven
2nd Diegem
3rd Gavere
 2nd Overall UCI World Cup
1st  Under-23 classification
1st Koksijde
2nd Namur
2nd Heusden-Zolder
2nd Nommay
 Ethias Cross
1st Meulebeke
1st Hulst
3rd Kruibeke
 Rectavit Series
1st Neerpelt
 1st Gullegem
2020–2021
 1st  UEC European Championships
 2nd Overall UCI World Cup
1st Overijse
2nd Tábor
3rd Dendermonde
3rd Hulst
 2nd Overall Superprestige
1st Gieten
1st Ruddervoorde
2nd Niel
2nd Boom
2nd Heusden-Zolder
2nd Middelkerke
3rd Merksplas
3rd Gavere
 3rd Overall X²O Badkamers Trophy
1st Herentals
1st Baal
1st Hamme
1st Lille
1st Brussels
 Ethias Cross
1st Leuven
2nd Beringen
2021–2022
 X²O Badkamers Trophy
2nd Kortrijk
2nd Baal
3rd Lille
 UCI World Cup
3rd Zonhoven
 3rd National Championships
2022–2023
 1st Overall Superprestige
1st Niel
1st Merksplas
1st Heusden-Zolder
1st Gullegem
1st Middelkerke
3rd Ruddervoorde
 2nd  UEC European Championships
 2nd National Championships
 UCI World Cup
2nd Waterloo
2nd Val di Sole
 Exact Cross
2nd Sint-Niklaas
 3rd Overall X²O Badkamers Trophy
2nd Kortrijk
2nd Lille
3rd Baal
3rd Hamme

Mountain Bike
2020
 1st  Cross-country, National Under-23 Championships
 1st  Overall UCI Under-23 XCO World Cup
1st Nové Město II
2nd Nové Město I
 3rd  Cross-country, UCI World Under-23 Championships

References

External links

1998 births
Living people
Dutch female cyclists
UCI Cyclo-cross World Champions (women)
Cyclo-cross cyclists
People from María Trinidad Sánchez Province
Dominican Republic emigrants to the Netherlands